Hands Up is a lost 1918 American adventure film serial directed by Louis J. Gasnier and James W. Horne. The serial was Ruth Roland's breakthrough role.

Plot

A newspaperwoman finds trouble aplenty when an Inca tribe believes her to be the reincarnation of their long-lost princess.

Cast
 Ruth Roland as Echo Delane. 
 George Larkin as Hands Up
 George Chesebro as Hands Up
 Easter Walters as Judith Strange
 William A. Carroll as Sam Killman / Omar the High Priest
 George Gebhardt as The Grand Envoy
 W. E. Lawrence as Prince Pampas (as William E. Lawrence)
 Thomas Jefferson
 Monte Blue

Chapter titles
The serial consisted of fifteen episodes, released from August 18 to November 24, 1918:
 Bride of the Sun 
 The Missing Prince 
 The Phantom and the Girl 
 The Phantom's Trail 
 The Runaway Bride 
 Flames of Vengeance 
 Tossed Into the Torrent 
 The Fatal Jewels 
 A Leap Through Space 
 The Sun Message 
 Stranger from the Sea 
 The Silver Book 
 The Last Warning 
 The Oracle's Decree 
 The Celestial Messenger

Censorship
Like many American films of the time, the film serial Hands Up was subject to restrictions and cuts by city and state film censorship boards. The Chicago Board of Censors required a cut in Chapter 1, Reel 3, of the slugging of a man; in Chapter 2, Reel 4, slugging man; in Chapter 3, Reel 1, Indian slugging man, masked man shooting Indian at barred window, Reel 2, shooting scene in which man falls, taking belt from ground, near view of man aiming gun at horseman and his falling off horse; Chapter 5, Reel 1, the two intertitles "I won her fair. She belongs to me now" and "She's mine again", the stabbing of the man, two scenes of Indian bending young woman back on table, Reel 2, slugging the engineer; Chapter 6, Reel 1, binding an Indian woman to telegraph pole and the young woman sitting on a bar; Chapter 8, Reel 1, slugging the man in the cabin, Reel 2, stabbing the man, binding the young woman, two scenes of tying the woman to the horse, and two scenes of dragging the woman; Chapter 9, Reel 1, first hula dance scene, young woman sitting at bar, young woman at table with arm around Mexican man's neck, four saloon fight scenes, Reel 2, first and third scene of man choking woman in bedroom; Chapter 11, Reel 1, the shooting of the old man and, Reel 2, binding of the young woman and old man; Chapter 12, Reel 2, two scenes of shooting and men falling; Chapter 13, Reel 1, the slugging of the guard at the door, and, Reel 2, the slugging of the man on the coach; and, Chapter 14, Reel 2, the shooting by Killman, the shooting of Killman, and the closeup of a choking scene.

References

External links

1918 films
1918 lost films
1918 adventure films
American silent serial films
American adventure films
American black-and-white films
Films directed by Louis J. Gasnier
Films directed by James W. Horne
Lost American films
Pathé Exchange film serials
Lost adventure films
Silent adventure films
1910s American films